The Sumatran porcupine (Hystrix sumatrae) is a species of rodent in the family Hystricidae. It is endemic to the Indonesian island of Sumatra, where it is hunted for food.

References

Further reading

Hystrix (mammal)
Mammals of Indonesia
Mammals described in 1907
Taxonomy articles created by Polbot